The 1964 Philadelphia Phillies season was the 82nd season for the franchise in Philadelphia. The Phillies finished in a second-place tie with the Cincinnati Reds. Both posted a record of 92–70, finishing one game behind the National League (NL) and World Series champion St. Louis Cardinals, and just two games ahead of fourth-place San Francisco. Gene Mauch managed the Phillies, who played their home games at Connie Mack Stadium.

The team is notable for being in first place in the National League since the opening day, and then suffering an unthinkable collapse during the final two weeks of the season. The "Phold of '64", as it became known, is one of the most infamous collapses in baseball history.

Offseason 
 December 5, 1963: Don Demeter and Jack Hamilton were traded by the Phillies to the Detroit Tigers for Jim Bunning and Gus Triandos.

The team 
From 1919 through 1947, the Phillies finished last a total of 17 times and next to last seven times. A 1962 cartoon in a baseball magazine depicted a ballplayer arriving at a French Foreign Legion outpost, explaining, "I was released by the Phillies!"

Things began to change slowly beginning in 1960 when Gene Mauch was hired as manager to replace Eddie Sawyer, who had resigned after the club's opening game of the regular season. Although the Phillies slumped to 47–107 in 1961 (including a 23-game losing streak), they began to climb back to respectability in 1962 and 1963. The front office, headed by John Quinn as General Manager, had replaced most of the players of the 1950s with new, young talent.

Chris Short was a rookie on the 1959 team, and by the end of 1963 was the ace of the staff. He was joined by Art Mahaffey in 1960, Dennis Bennett in 1962 and Ray Culp in 1963 as starters. The bullpen had Ed Roebuck, who was purchased from the Washington Senators in April 1964, as the primary relief pitcher, along with John Boozer and Dallas Green. Rookie Rick Wise, primarily a reliever but also a spot-starter, joined the club in June. Jack Baldschun was the closer. The catching duties were platooned between Clay Dalrymple, who was the regular catcher since 1960 and Gus Triandos, who acted both as Bunning's personal catcher and as Dalrymple's backup, having come over from Detroit in the Bunning trade (below).

The infield had two fine shortstops in Bobby Wine and Rubén Amaro, and two fine second basemen in Tony Taylor and Cookie Rojas. Mauch could and did platoon them depending on the pitcher they were facing. Richie Allen (who years later would be called Dick Allen) came up in September 1963 as a rookie showing much promise, and during spring training, made the club as the starting third baseman. John Herrnstein was at first.

In the outfield Johnny Callison was in right field, Tony Gonzalez in center, and Wes Covington was in left field. Covington was first platooned with rookie Danny Cater in left; however, Cater suffered a broken arm in a game against Milwaukee on 22 July and didn't return to the lineup until late September.

The most important acquisition by the Phillies in the off-season of 1963 was the acquisition of Jim Bunning. Bunning had been with the Detroit Tigers since 1955 and was one of the best pitchers in the American League, throwing a no-hitter against the Boston Red Sox in 1958 and was a five-time All-Star. However, in 1963 he began having problems with the front office of the Tigers, and did not get along well with the Tigers' new manager, Charlie Dressen. Also, Bunning was having a mediocre season with Detroit, and Dressen believed that Bunning's career was over at the age of 31. Denny McLain, a rising star with the Tigers, began to get Bunning's starts in September and by the end of the season after going 12–13, Bunning was asking the Tiger management for a trade. His wishes were complied with, and he and Triandos were sent to the Phillies in exchange for outfielder Don Demeter and pitcher Jack Hamilton.

Regular season 
Throughout the 1964 season, the Phillies seemed destined to make it to the World Series. Since the beginning of the season, with an 8–2 start, the team had been in first place, and had led the National League all season, sometimes by as many as nine or ten games.

During the season Johnny Callison was having a career year and was the top contender for the National League Most Valuable Player award. Richie Allen was the leading candidate for Rookie of the Year (which he won in the postseason). In addition to his pitching, Bunning also added another dimension to the club. Chris Short had been the ace of the staff prior to Bunning joining the club. However, he never was comfortable being the leading pitcher and having that responsibility. With Bunning joining the staff, the pressure was off Short and he thrived as the number-two starter.

The 1964 National League All-Star team had three Phillies: Chris Short, Jim Bunning, and Johnny Callison. Callison was named the game's Most Valuable Player, hitting a fast ball by Boston Red Sox ace Dick Radatz into the right field stands at Shea Stadium for a 3-run home run in the 9th inning for the win. Then in early August, the Phillies acquired Frank Thomas from the New York Mets and Vic Power from Los Angeles Angels to shore up the bench for the pennant run in September. The Phillies were having their best season since the 1950 "Whiz Kids", giving "pennant fever" to their fans for the first time in 14 seasons.

Jim Bunning's perfect game 

From opening day, Bunning thrived in the National League, going 6–2 in the first two months of the season, and becoming the ace of the pitching staff. On Father's Day he got the start for the first game of a doubleheader against the New York Mets, and on that day, June 21, he threw the first perfect game in the National League since 1880.

Tracy Stallard started for the Mets in the first game of the doubleheader that day. As the game progressed, Philadelphia scored single runs in both the 1st and 2nd innings and had a big inning in the 6th, scoring four runs to take a 6–0 lead. On the mound, Bunning had a strong performance against the Mets batters, striking out 10.

For perhaps the only time in the stadium's history, the Shea faithful found themselves rooting for the visitors, caught up in the rare achievement, and roaring for Bunning on every pitch in the ninth inning. His strikeout of John Stephenson for the last out capped the performance.

The "Phold"

Beginnings
On September 1 the Phillies held a -game lead over the Cincinnati Reds and it seemed were in cruise mode to clinching the pennant. TV Guide went to press with a World Series preview that featured a photo of Connie Mack Stadium. (Through the 1968 season, both first-place teams automatically went to the World Series, the only postseason play at the time.)

On September 7, Labor Day, the Phillies split a doubleheader with the Dodgers while the Reds lost 2 games to the St. Louis Cardinals. That increased the Phillies' lead to  games with 25 left to play. Then things started to go wrong, first with a string of injuries. The next game, Frank Thomas broke his right thumb sliding into second base against Maury Wills, the Dodger shortstop. The number four starter, Ray Culp, started to have problems with his right elbow; Dennis Bennett began having a sore arm. Art Mahaffey began to have control problems, being taken out in the first inning on September 8th; in his next start, against the San Francisco Giants, he was taken out in the third inning.

Things appeared to settle down on September 13 when Bunning beat the Giants for his 17th win, and Short and Bennett followed up with wins over the Houston Colt .45s. However, Bunning replaced Culp for the start on the 16th for the last game against Houston and, pitching on two days' rest, gave up a two-run home run by Rusty Staub and lasted only  innings (charged with 4 more runs). On  September 20, Bunning beat the Dodgers in Los Angeles, 3–2, throwing a five-hitter. Bunning remembered that the club had been shaky; the Phillies almost blew the game in the ninth when Vic Power made an error, leading to two unearned runs. Then Bunning finished the game by striking out the Dodger catcher, Johnny Roseboro. After the game, a reporter from Sports Illustrated photographed Bunning. It was to be on the cover of the magazine for its World Series edition in October.

During the month, the club had gone 12–9 and the lead over the Reds remained at  games with 12 games to play.
However, the win over the Dodgers on the 20th would be the last win by the Phillies in September.

"The Curse of Chico Ruiz"
On September 21, the team returned to Philadelphia to begin a three-game series (a sweep of that series would have clinched the pennant for the Phils) against the Reds as part of a seven-game homestand, which included four against the Milwaukee Braves. Then the Phillies would go on the road, play three games in St. Louis, and end the season with 2 games in Cincinnati.

Art Mahaffey began his first start since a 9–1 loss to the Giants on the 12th, pitching against John Tsitouris in the first game against the Reds. It was a pitchers' duel until the 6th inning when Chico Ruiz hit a single which was followed up by Vada Pinson hitting a line drive through the pitcher's box and past second base until Johnny Callison got the ball and threw out Pinson as he tried to reach 2nd base. Ruiz made it over to third on the play. Frank Robinson then came up to bat, and swung and missed for strike one. Ruiz, on third, noted that Mahaffey had not checked him before pitching. On the next pitch, Ruiz broke for home plate. Surprised, Mahaffey pitched high and wild and the Phillies' catcher, Clay Dalrymple, jumped high but missed the ball, which went back to the screen. Ruiz successfully stole home plate, giving the Reds the lead and the game's only run. Richie (later Dick) Allen said of the play: "The play broke our humps."

Chico Ruiz's steal of home has evolved into a popular culture legend. Some Philadelphia sports fans still refer to the "Curse of Chico Ruiz" as the reason for many of their teams' misfortunes.

The Collapse

In the next game, manager Gene Mauch rode Robinson, Ruiz and the rest of the Reds hard from the dugout, yelling over at them constantly about Ruiz and his stealing home the night before. The Reds responded with Frank Robinson hitting a two-run homer off Chris Short, who had to be taken out in the fifth inning. The Phillies lost and their lead was down to  games. In the third game of the series with the Reds, things went from bad to worse, when Dennis Bennett lasted six innings with a sore arm as the Phillies lost again, 6–4, with Pinson and Ruiz hitting home runs. The lead was now down to  games.

Milwaukee came in next and Bunning was the starter in game one. Joe Torre drove in three runs with two triples due to misplays in the outfield in a 5–3 loss, the fourth in a row. Then Chris Short pitched on two days' rest in the next game, the Phillies lost, and the losing streak was at five, with the lead now down to a game-and-a-half. The Braves then beat the Phillies, 6–4 (Art Mahaffey starting for the Phillies), and the lead dropped to a half-game over the Reds. Bunning then came in for game four, also pitching on two days' rest, and lasted three innings in a 14–8 loss. With the fourth loss against the Braves and the 7th loss in a row, the Phillies dropped to second and the Reds, having swept a doubleheader, took first place by 1 game. The Cardinals were right behind, a game-and-a-half out of first place. The Phillies had lost every game of their last homestand of the season.

The crucial series came when the now second-place Phillies traveled to St. Louis to play the Cardinals after their losing home stand. They dropped the first game of the series to Bob Gibson by a 5–1 score, their eighth loss in a row, dropping them to third place. The Cardinals would sweep the three-game set and assume first place for good.

The losing streak ended in Cincinnati during the last two games of the season with wins of 4–3 and 10–0 over the Reds. However, there were no playoffs in 1964 and the second-place Phillies ended the season at 92–70, tied with the Reds. It was the best season by the Phillies since the 1950 pennant-winning Whiz Kids, but there was no joy in the City of Brotherly Love. The "Phold", as the ten-game loss streak is known, is one of the most notable collapses in sports history.

Epilogue

Richie Allen
Richie Allen (later known as Dick Allen) had one of the greatest seasons by a rookie ever in major league baseball in 1964. He led the National League in runs (125), triples (13), extra base hits (80) and total bases (352); he finished in the top five in batting average (.318), slugging average (.557), hits (201), and doubles (38); and won Rookie of the Year. Allen boasted a powerful and muscular physique, and 18 of his 29 home runs cleared Connie Mack Stadium's 65-foot-high left field grandstand, and twice cleared that park's 65-foot-high right center field scoreboard, a feat considered virtually impossible for a right-handed hitter.

Allen was also one of the most controversial players in Philadelphia for some notable non-baseball incidents. Allen spoke his mind, combatted racism, and bucked organizational hierarchy; he almost ended his career in 1967 after mangling his throwing hand by pushing it through a car headlight. Allen was fined $2,500 and suspended indefinitely in 1969 when he failed to appear for the Phillies twi-night doubleheader game with the New York Mets. (He would be reinstated, and, despite wanting to be traded, agreed to finish the season with the Phillies.) Allen had gone to New Jersey in the morning to see a horse race, and got caught in traffic trying to return. He was traded after the 1969 season to the Cardinals for Curt Flood. Even this caused controversy, though not of Allen's making. Flood refused to report to the Phillies and subsequently sued Major League Baseball in an unsuccessful attempt to overthrow the reserve clause and to be declared a free agent (Flood's lawsuit failed; however, the reserve clause was thrown out in 1975). After leaving the Phillies, he asked to be called "Dick", saying Richie was a little boy's name. He played for several teams, and then went into a controversial retirement in 1974.

Early in the 1975 season, Phillies general manager Paul Owens wanted a right-handed power hitter and a first baseman. Both Mike Schmidt and Dave Cash lobbied Owens to acquire Dick Allen. Allen had to be persuaded by several of his future teammates that both the organizational and racial climate in Philadelphia had changed for the better since his 1969 departure from the team. On May 4, the Phillies traded their first baseman Willie Montañez (who came from the Cardinals in 1970 as compensation after Curt Flood refused to report as part of the Allen trade) to the Giants for Garry Maddox which provided a bat for the outfield and opened first for Allen. The Phillies acquired Allen three days later on May 7, 1975.

Allen found Veterans Stadium much to his liking, putting several home-run balls into the far parts of the upper deck. He was part of the 1976 Phillies National League East Championship team, before leaving for the Oakland Athletics for his final season in 1977. Many people believe that Allen is the best major league player not in the Baseball Hall of Fame.

Jim Bunning
The perfect game was the highlight of the Philadelphia career of Bunning, who became a fan favorite and the club's ace starter for the next four seasons, being one of the most dominant pitchers in the Major Leagues. From 1964 through 1967, Bunning led MLB pitchers in fWAR and innings pitched, ranked second in the NL in wins, ranked second in the NL in games started, and ranked third in the NL in ERA. He was traded to the Pittsburgh Pirates prior to the 1968 season, was briefly with the Dodgers, then returned to the Phillies for two mediocre seasons during 1970 and 1971. He pitched the first game at Veterans Stadium in April 1971, beating the Montreal Expos. Largely on account of the perfect game and three 19-win seasons (1964–1966) with the Phillies, today Bunning is memorialized in the Philadelphia Baseball Wall of Fame (1984), and was inducted into the Baseball Hall of Fame by the Veterans' Committee in 1996.

Thirty years later, Bunning, by then a member of Congress, talked about The "Phold" to David Halberstam and said that to understand what happened, you had to be there and be caught up in the emotions and excitement of the pennant race. Also, there was a belief by the Phillies that they could prevail simply by sheer will. Pitching on short rest, the injuries, and the reality of pitching with a good deal more fatigue than he recognized all led to a loss of confidence. Players began to have doubts when before there were no doubts. The team began to run the bases poorly and throw badly, missing easy plays and making errors they would not normally have made.

Rick Wise
Rick Wise, who won the second game against the Mets after Bunning's perfect game, became a solid starter and the ace of the Phillies pitching staff in the years after the 1964 season. In 1971 he threw a no-hitter against the Reds and hit two home runs in the game at Riverfront Stadium. As a result of a salary dispute, he was traded by the Phillies in the spring of 1972 to the Cardinals for Steve Carlton, who was also having salary issues. Carlton went on to anchor the Phillies' pitching staff for the next thirteen seasons, ultimately winning 329 games and a place in the Baseball Hall of Fame. Wise went from the Cardinals to the Red Sox in 1974. He was the winning pitcher for the Red Sox in Game 6 of the 1975 World Series over the Cincinnati Reds, considered by some to be the greatest Series game ever played.

Wise was the last member of the 1964 Philadelphia Phillies team to be active in the major leagues, pitching 2 innings of relief (7th and 8th innings) for the San Diego Padres against the Los Angeles Dodgers on 10 April 1982.

Echoes of the 1964 season
The Phillies finished sixth in the National League in 1965, and began to slide back into mediocrity. It was not until the 1976 season, twelve seasons later, that the Phillies won the National League Eastern Division Championship; losing to the Reds in the playoffs (Dick Allen and Tony Taylor were part of the 1976 Phillies). The 1977 and 1978 teams also won the National League East, but both lost to the Dodgers in the playoffs; it was not until the 1980 Philadelphia Phillies (managed by 1964 alumnus Dallas Green, with Bobby Wine and Rubén Amaro as coaches) won both the National League Pennant against the Houston Astros and also the World Series against the Kansas City Royals that the stigma of the 1964 "Phold" was fully erased after sixteen seasons.

The 1964 Phillies are immortalized in American pop culture via numerous book chapters, magazine articles, and newspaper columns. At least three full-length books are devoted to the 1964 Phillies: non-fiction books The 1964 Phillies: The Story of Baseball's Most Memorable Collapse by John P. Rossi and September Swoon: Richie Allen, the '64 Phillies, and Racial Integration by William C. Kashatis; and a novel based on the 1964 Phillies collapse titled  '64 Intruder, by Gregory T. Glading, which centers on a Phillies fan going back in time and preventing Chico Ruiz from stealing home in the "Phold's" first loss. A 2014 Twitter feed @epic64collapse provides a day-by-day account of the entire season.

The Philadelphia Baseball Wall of Fame honors no less than five 1964 Phillies players: Richie Allen, Jim Bunning, Johnny Callison, Dallas Green and Tony Taylor. Manager Gene Mauch is also honored.

Notable transactions 
 April 6, 1964: Darrell Sutherland was selected off waivers from the Phillies by the New York Mets as a first-year waiver pick.
 June 19, 1964: Joe Lis was signed as an amateur free agent by the Phillies.
 August 7, 1964: Wayne Graham, Gary Kroll, and cash were traded by the Phillies to the New York Mets for Frank Thomas.

Season standings

Record vs. opponents

Game log

|- style="background:#bfb"
| 1 || April 14 || Mets || 5–3 || Johnny Klippstein (1–0) || Al Jackson (0–1) || None || 21,016 || 1–0
|- style="background:#bfb"
| 2 || April 15 || Mets || 4–1 || Jim Bunning (1–0) || Tracy Stallard (0–1) || None || 8,528 || 2–0
|- style="background:#bfb"
| 3 || April 17 || @ Cubs || 10–8 || Johnny Klippstein (2–0) || Dick Ellsworth (0–1) || Jack Baldschun (1) || 18,868 || 3–0
|- style="background:#fbb"
| 4 || April 18 || @ Cubs || 0–7 || Bob Buhl (1–0) || Ray Culp (0–1) || None || 9,256 || 3–1
|- style="background:#bfb"
| 5 || April 19 || @ Cubs || 8–1 || Dennis Bennett (1–0) || Larry Jackson (1–1) || None || 7,296 || 4–1
|- style="background:#bbb"
| – || April 20 || @ Mets || colspan=6 | Postponed (rain); 
|- style="background:#bbb"
| – || April 21 || @ Mets || colspan=6 | Postponed (rain, cold, and wet grounds); 
|- style="background:#bbb"
| – || April 22 || Pirates || colspan=6 | Postponed (rain); 
|- style="background:#bfb"
| 6 || April 23 || Pirates || 6–5 || Jack Baldschun (1–0) || Roy Face (2–2) || None || 12,851 || 5–1
|- style="background:#bfb"
| 7 || April 24 || Cubs || 10–0 || Jim Bunning (2–0) || Bob Buhl (1–1) || None || 15,255 || 6–1
|- style="background:#fbb"
| 8 || April 25 || Cubs || 1–4 || Larry Jackson (2–1) || Dennis Bennett (1–1) || Lindy McDaniel (2) || 17,316 || 6–2
|- style="background:#bfb"
| 9 || April 26 || Cubs || 5–1 || Ray Culp (1–1) || Fred Norman (0–2) || Ed Roebuck (1) || 12,522 || 7–2
|- style="background:#bfb"
| 10 || April 28 || @ Reds || 4–2 || Art Mahaffey (1–0) || Jim O'Toole (2–1) || Chris Short (1) || 5,117 || 8–2
|- style="background:#bbb"
| – || April 29 || @ Reds || colspan=6 | Postponed (rain); 
|- style="background:#bfb"
| 11 || April 30 || @ Reds || 3–1 || Dennis Bennett (2–1) || Joe Nuxhall (1–2) || None || 2,821 || 9–2

|- style="background:#bfb"
| 12 || May 1 || @ Braves || 5–3 || Jim Bunning (3–0) || Warren Spahn (1–2) || Ed Roebuck (2) || 4,727 || 10–2
|- style="background:#fbb"
| 13 || May 2 || @ Braves || 2–11 || Bob Sadowski (2–2) || Ray Culp (1–2) || None || 6,174 || 10–3
|- style="background:#fbb"
| 14 || May 3 || @ Braves || 0–1 || Hank Fischer (3–9) || Art Mahaffey (1–1) || None || 14,753 || 10–4
|- style="background:#fbb"
| 15 || May 4 || @ Cardinals || 2–9 || Roger Craig (2–0) || Dennis Bennett (2–2) || None || 7,437 || 10–5
|- style="background:#fbb"
| 16 || May 5 || @ Cardinals || 1–2 || Ray Washburn (1–0) || Jim Bunning (3–1) || Ron Taylor (1) || 10,443 || 10–6
|- style="background:#bfb"
| 17 || May 6 || Braves || 7–6 || Ed Roebuck (1–0) || Bobby Tiefenauer (1–1) || None || 14,331 || 11–6
|- style="background:#bfb"
| 18 || May 7 || Braves || 9–6 || Art Mahaffey (2–1) || Hank Fischer (3–1) || Jack Baldschun (2) || 11,749 || 12–6
|- style="background:#bfb"
| 19 || May 8 || Reds || 11–3 || Dennis Bennett (3–2) || John Tsitouris (1–2) || None || 23,004 || 13–6
|- style="background:#bfb"
| 20 || May 9 || Reds || 5–4 || Dallas Green (1–0) || Bob Purkey (0–2) || Ed Roebuck (3) || 8,142 || 14–6
|- style="background:#fbb"
| 21 || May 10 || Reds || 0–2 || Joe Nuxhall (2–2) || Chris Short (0–1) || None || 11,642 || 14–7
|- style="background:#fbb"
| 22 || May 11 || Cardinals || 2–3 || Ray Sadecki (1–3) || Ray Culp (1–3) || None || 11,200 || 14–8
|- style="background:#fbb"
| 23 || May 12 || Cardinals || 2–4 || Curt Simmons (4–2) || Art Mahaffey (2–2) || Roger Craig (3) || 14,412 || 14–9
|- style="background:#bbb"
| – || May 13 || Cardinals || colspan=6 | Postponed (rain); 
|- style="background:#bfb"
| 24 || May 14 || Cardinals || 3–2 || Jim Bunning (4–1) || Ernie Broglio (2–2) || Ed Roebuck (4) || 16,626 || 15–9
|- style="background:#bfb"
| 25 || May 15 || @ Colt .45s || 4–0 || Dennis Bennett (4–2) || Don Nottebart (0–5) || None || 8,945 || 16–9
|- style="background:#fbb"
| 26 || May 16 || @ Colt .45s || 3–4 || Turk Farrell (5–1) || Ray Culp (1–4) || Hal Woodeshick (7) || 11,331 || 16–10
|- style="background:#bfb"
| 27 || May 17 || @ Colt .45s || 2–0 || Chris Short (1–1) || Jim Owens (1–3) || None || 7,784 || 17–10
|- style="background:#bfb"
| 28 || May 18 || @ Colt .45s || 4–0 || Jim Bunning (5–1) || Ken Johnson (3–4) || None || 5,284 || 18–10
|- style="background:#fbb"
| 29 || May 19 || @ Giants || 0–3 || Jack Sanford (4–3) || Dennis Bennett (4–3) || None || 16,936 || 18–11
|- style="background:#bfb"
| 30 || May 20 || @ Giants || 7–2 || Jack Baldschun (2–0) || Juan Marichal (6–1) || None || 12,284 || 19–11
|- style="background:#fbb"
| 31 || May 21 || @ Giants || 4–9 || Bobby Bolin (1–1) || Johnny Klippstein (2–1) || None || 11,222 || 19–12
|- style="background:#bfb"
| 32 || May 22 || @ Dodgers || 2–0 || Chris Short (2–1) || Don Drysdale (5–3) || None || 38,920 || 20–12
|- style="background:#bfb"
| 33 || May 23 || @ Dodgers || 4–2  || Dennis Bennett (5–3) || Ron Perranoski (2–1) || Jack Baldschun (3) || 42,349 || 21–12
|- style="background:#fbb"
| 34 || May 24 || @ Dodgers || 0–3 || Joe Moeller (2–3) || Jim Bunning (5–2) || Sandy Koufax (1) || 36,900 || 21–13
|- style="background:#fbb"
| 35 || May 26 || @ Pirates || 4–13 || Vern Law (2–4) || Chris Short (2–2) || None || 12,183 || 21–14
|- style="background:#bfb"
| 36 || May 27 || @ Pirates || 2–0 || Art Mahaffey (3–2) || Bob Friend (4–4) || None || 10,914 || 22–14
|- style="background:#fbb"
| 37 || May 28 || @ Pirates || 5–6 || Al McBean (2–0) || Jack Baldschun (2–1) || None || 8,649 || 22–15
|- style="background:#bfb"
| 38 || May 29 || Colt .45s || 7–6 || Dennis Bennett (6–3) || Hal Woodeshick (1–3) || Ed Roebuck (5) || 13,067 || 23–15
|- style="background:#bfb"
| 39 || May 30 || Colt .45s || 5–1 || Chris Short (3–2) || Don Nottebart (0–7) || None || 19,046 || 24–15
|- style="background:#bfb"
| 40 || May 31 || Colt .45s || 4–1 || Art Mahaffey (4–2) || Jim Owens (1–4) || Ed Roebuck (6) || 8,154 || 25–15

|- style="background:#bfb"
| 41 || June 2 || Dodgers || 4–3 || Dennis Bennett (7–3) || Jim Brewer (0–1) || Ed Roebuck (7) || 22,317 || 26–15
|- style="background:#bfb"
| 42 || June 3 || Dodgers || 1–0  || Jack Baldschun (3–1) || Don Drysdale (6–5) || None || 20,961 || 27–15
|- style="background:#fbb"
| 43 || June 4 || Dodgers || 0–3 || Sandy Koufax (6–4) || Chris Short (3–3) || None || 29,709 || 27–16
|- style="background:#fbb"
| 44 || June 5 || Giants || 3–5  || Bob Shaw (4–3) || Jack Baldschun (3–2) || Ron Herbel (1) || 31,774 || 27–17
|- style="background:#fbb"
| 45 || June 6 || Giants || 2–4 || Billy O'Dell (1–1) || Ed Roebuck (1–1) || None || 13,286 || 27–18
|- style="background:#fbb"
| 46 || June 7 || Giants || 3–4  || Bob Shaw (5–3) || Ed Roebuck (1–2) || Billy Pierce (1) || 27,675 || 27–19
|- style="background:#bfb"
| 47 || June 9  || Pirates || 4–3 || Art Mahaffey (5–2) || Joe Gibbon (3–2) || Ed Roebuck (8) ||  || 28–19
|- style="background:#fbb"
| 48 || June 9  || Pirates || 0–4 || Steve Blass (3–2) || Ray Culp (1–5) || None || 32,155 || 28–20
|- style="background:#bfb"
| 49 || June 10 || Pirates || 4–1 || Chris Short (4–3) || Bob Friend (4–6) || None || 15,352 || 29–20
|- style="background:#fbb"
| 50 || June 12 || Mets || 3–11 || Tracy Stallard (4–7) || Dennis Bennett (7–4) || None || 16,661 || 29–21
|- style="background:#bfb"
| 51 || June 13 || Mets || 8–2 || Jim Bunning (6–2) || Frank Lary (0–3) || None || 4,875 || 30–21
|- style="background:#bfb"
| 52 || June 14  || Mets || 9–5 || Ray Culp (2–5) || Galen Cisco (3–7) || None ||  || 31–21
|- style="background:#bfb"
| 53 || June 14  || Mets || 4–2 || Art Mahaffey (6–2) || Al Jackson (3–9) || Ed Roebuck (9) || 21,020 || 32–21
|- style="background:#bfb"
| 54 || June 16 || @ Cubs || 4–2 || Dennis Bennett (8–4) || Larry Jackson (8–5) || Jack Baldschun (4) || 8,744 || 33–21
|- style="background:#fbb"
| 55 || June 17 || @ Cubs || 5–9 || Bob Buhl (8–3) || Jack Baldschun (3–3) || Lindy McDaniel (7) || 9,106 || 33–22
|- style="background:#bfb"
| 56 || June 18 || @ Cubs || 6–3 || Chris Short (5–3) || Dick Ellsworth (8–6) || Jim Bunning (1) || 9,283 || 34–22
|- style="background:#bfb"
| 57 || June 19  || @ Mets || 2–1 || Art Mahaffey (7–2) || Larry Bearnarth (4–4) || Ed Roebuck (10) ||  || 35–22
|- style="background:#bfb"
| 58 || June 19  || @ Mets || 7–2 || Ray Culp (3–5) || Galen Cisco (3–8) || None || 41,310 || 36–22
|- style="background:#fbb"
| 59 || June 20 || @ Mets || 3–7 || Jack Fisher (5–5) || Dallas Green (1–1) || Al Jackson (1) || 18,004 || 36–23
|- style="background:#bfb"
| 60 || June 21  || @ Mets || 6–0 || Jim Bunning (7–2) || Tracy Stallard (4–9) || None ||  || 37–23
|- style="background:#bfb"
| 61 || June 21  || @ Mets || 8–2 || Rick Wise (1–0) || Frank Lary (0–4) || Johnny Klippstein (1) || 32,026 || 38–23
|- style="background:#fbb"
| 62 || June 23  || Cubs || 0–2 || Dick Ellsworth (9–6) || Chris Short (5–4) || None ||  || 38–24
|- style="background:#bfb"
| 63 || June 23  || Cubs || 9–0 || Ray Culp (4–5) || Sterling Slaughter (2–2) || None || 35,483 || 39–24
|- style="background:#bfb"
| 64 || June 24 || Cubs || 9–8 || Dallas Green (2–1) || Ernie Broglio (3–7) || None || 19,711 || 40–24
|- style="background:#bfb"
| 65 || June 26 || @ Cardinals || 6–5 || Ed Roebuck (2–2) || Ron Taylor (1–2) || None || 18,484 || 41–24
|- style="background:#fbb"
| 66 || June 27 || @ Cardinals || 4–9 || Curt Simmons (8–6) || Rick Wise (1–1) || None || 12,388 || 41–25
|- style="background:#bfb"
| 67 || June 28  || @ Cardinals || 5–0 || Chris Short (6–4) || Mike Cuellar (0–1) || None ||  || 42–25
|- style="background:#fbb"
| 68 || June 28  || @ Cardinals || 2–8 || Ray Sadecki (8–6) || Ray Culp (4–6) || None || 27,805 || 42–26
|- style="background:#fbb"
| 69 || June 29 || @ Colt .45s || 1–6 || Bob Bruce (8–4) || Art Mahaffey (7–3) || None || 11,103 || 42–27
|- style="background:#bfb"
| 70 || June 30 || @ Colt .45s || 8–1 || Jim Bunning (8–2) || Ken Johnson (6–7) || None || 16,414 || 43–27

|- style="background:#fbb"
| 71 || July 1 || @ Dodgers || 2–3 || Sandy Koufax (11–4) || Dennis Bennett (8–5) || None || 39,823 || 43–28
|- style="background:#bfb"
| 72 || July 2 || @ Dodgers || 3–2 || Chris Short (7–4) || Phil Ortega (3–3) || Jack Baldschun (5) || 35,541 || 44–28
|- style="background:#bfb"
| 73 || July 3 || @ Giants || 5–1 || Ray Culp (5–6) || Ron Herbel (6–4) || None || 27,068 || 45–28
|- style="background:#bfb"
| 74 || July 4 || @ Giants || 5–2  || Jim Bunning (9–2) || Gaylord Perry (6–4) || Jack Baldschun (6) || 30,529 || 46–28
|- style="background:#bfb"
| 75 || July 5 || @ Giants || 2–1 || Dennis Bennett (9–5) || Juan Marichal (11–4) || Jack Baldschun (7) || 38,641 || 47–28
|- style="background:#bbcaff;"
| – || July 7 ||colspan=7 |1964 Major League Baseball All-Star Game at Shea Stadium in Queens
|- style="background:#bfb"
| 76 || July 9 || Reds || 4–3 || Ray Culp (6–6) || John Tsitouris (5–6) || Jack Baldschun (8) || 18,404 || 48–28
|- style="background:#fbb"
| 77 || July 10 || Reds || 1–5 || Jim O'Toole (9–4) || Dennis Bennett (9–6) || None || 25,936 || 48–29
|- style="background:#fbb"
| 78 || July 11 || Reds || 1–3 || Joe Nuxhall (7–4) || Jim Bunning (9–3) || Sammy Ellis (2) || 10,146 || 48–30
|- style="background:#fbb"
| 79 || July 12  || Braves || 3–4 || Wade Blasingame (2–1) || Chris Short (7–5) || Chi-Chi Olivo (2) ||  || 48–31
|- style="background:#fbb"
| 80 || July 12  || Braves || 2–6 || Billy Hoeft (3–0) || Art Mahaffey (7–4) || None || 28,044 || 48–32
|- style="background:#bfb"
| 81 || July 13 || Braves || 3–2 || Ray Culp (7–6) || Warren Spahn (6–9) || Jim Bunning (2) || 13,817 || 49–32
|- style="background:#fbb"
| 82 || July 14 || @ Pirates || 3–4 || Bob Veale (9–6) || Cal McLish (0–1) || Al McBean (12) || 9,664 || 49–33
|- style="background:#fbb"
| 83 || July 15 || @ Pirates || 0–3 || Bob Friend (8–8) || Jim Bunning (9–4) || None || 11,633 || 49–34
|- style="background:#bfb"
| 84 || July 16 || @ Pirates || 7–5 || Art Mahaffey (8–4) || Joe Gibbon (6–3) || Jack Baldschun (9) || 12,163 || 50–34
|- style="background:#bfb"
| 85 || July 17 || @ Reds || 5–4 || Chris Short (8–5) || Joey Jay (4–7) || Dennis Bennett (1) || 19,008 || 51–34
|- style="background:#fbb"
| 86 || July 18 || @ Reds || 4–14 || John Tsitouris (6–6) || Ray Culp (7–7) || None || 8,251 || 51–35
|- style="background:#fbb"
| 87 || July 19  || @ Reds || 4–7 || Billy McCool (3–0) || Jack Baldschun (3–4) || Sammy Ellis (4) ||  || 51–36
|- style="background:#bfb"
| 88 || July 19  || @ Reds || 4–3 || John Boozer (1–0) || Ryne Duren (0–2) || Chris Short (2) || 27,245 || 52–36
|- style="background:#fbb"
| 89 || July 20 || @ Reds || 2–6 || Joe Nuxhall (8–4) || Dennis Bennett (9–7) || Billy McCool (4) || 10,229 || 52–37
|- style="background:#bfb"
| 90 || July 21 || @ Braves || 6–3 || Art Mahaffey (9–4) || Wade Blasingame (2–2) || Jack Baldschun (10) || 22,110 || 53–37
|- style="background:#bfb"
| 91 || July 22 || @ Braves || 4–1 || Ray Culp (8–7) || Warren Spahn (6–11) || Jack Baldschun (11) || 20,457 || 54–37
|- style="background:#bfb"
| 92 || July 23 || @ Braves || 13–10  || Jack Baldschun (4–4) || Bobby Tiefenauer (3–5) || Dennis Bennett (2) || 10,507 || 55–37
|- style="background:#bfb"
| 93 || July 24 || Cardinals || 9–1 || Chris Short (9–5) || Bob Gibson (8–8) || None || 22,628 || 56–37
|- style="background:#fbb"
| 94 || July 25 || Cardinals || 9–10 || Curt Simmons (10–8) || Dennis Bennett (9–8) || Mike Cuellar (2) || 10,948 || 56–38
|- style="background:#fbb"
| 95 || July 26  || Cardinals || 1–6 || Gordie Richardson (1–0) || John Boozer (1–1) || None ||  || 56–39
|- style="background:#fbb"
| 96 || July 26  || Cardinals || 1–4 || Ray Sadecki (11–8) || Art Mahaffey (9–5) || None || 28,118 || 56–40
|- style="background:#bfb"
| 97 || July 28 || Giants || 4–0 || Jim Bunning (10–4) || Billy O'Dell (3–4) || Jack Baldschun (12) || 29,386 || 57–40
|- style="background:#fbb"
| 98 || July 29 || Giants || 3–6  || Juan Marichal (15–5) || Jack Baldschun (4–5) || None || 27,979 || 57–41
|- style="background:#bfb"
| 99 || July 30 || Giants || 4–3  || Art Mahaffey (10–5) || Gaylord Perry (7–8) || None || 27,694 || 58–41
|- style="background:#bfb"
| 100 || July 31 || Dodgers || 6–1 || Chris Short (10–5) || Joe Moeller (5–10) || Jack Baldschun (13) || 24,197 || 59–41

|- style="background:#bfb"
| 101 || August 1 || Dodgers || 10–6 || Rick Wise (2–1) || Don Drysdale (13–10) || Ed Roebuck (11) || 32,030 || 60–41
|- style="background:#fbb"
| 102 || August 2 || Dodgers || 1–6 || Larry Miller (2–2) || John Boozer (1–2) || None || 18,802 || 60–42
|- style="background:#bbb"
| – || August 3 || Dodgers || colspan=6 | Postponed (rain); 
|- style="background:#bfb"
| 103 || August 5  || Colt .45s || 4–1 || Jim Bunning (11–4) || Bob Bruce (11–6) || Jack Baldschun (14) ||  || 61–42
|- style="background:#bfb"
| 104 || August 5  || Colt .45s || 2–1 || Ed Roebuck (3–2) || Hal Woodeshick (2–7) || None || 27,288 || 62–42
|- style="background:#fbb"
| 105 || August 6 || Colt .45s || 1–2 || Turk Farrell (11–7) || Chris Short (10–6) || Jim Owens (2) || 15,083 || 62–43
|- style="background:#bfb"
| 106 || August 7 || Mets || 9–4 || Ed Roebuck (4–2) || Bill Wakefield (3–4) || Jack Baldschun (15) || 14,158 || 63–43
|- style="background:#bfb"
| 107 || August 8 || Mets || 12–5 || Rick Wise (3–1) || Galen Cisco (4–13) || John Boozer (1) || 7,687 || 64–43
|- style="background:#bfb"
| 108 || August 9 || Mets || 6–0 || Jim Bunning (12–4) || Tracy Stallard (6–15) || None || 11,621 || 65–43
|- style="background:#bfb"
| 109 || August 11 || @ Cubs || 13–5 || John Boozer (2–2) || Dick Ellsworth (12–14) || None || 11,972 || 66–43
|- style="background:#bfb"
| 110 || August 12 || @ Cubs || 6–5 || Chris Short (11–6) || Larry Jackson (14–10) || Jack Baldschun (16) || 8,633 || 67–43
|- style="background:#fbb"
| 111 || August 13 || @ Cubs || 1–3 || Ernie Broglio (7–9) || Dennis Bennett (9–9) || None || 8,347 || 67–44
|- style="background:#bfb"
| 112 || August 14  || @ Mets || 6–1 || Jim Bunning (13–4) || Al Jackson (6–12) || None ||  || 68–44
|- style="background:#bfb"
| 113 || August 14  || @ Mets || 6–4 || Rick Wise (4–1) || Tracy Stallard (6–16) || Jack Baldschun (17) || 42,806 || 69–44
|- style="background:#bfb"
| 114 || August 15 || @ Mets || 8–1 || John Boozer (2–3) || Jack Fisher (8–15) || None || 31,324 || 70–44
|- style="background:#fbb"
| 115 || August 16 || @ Mets || 4–12 || Galen Cisco (5–13) || Art Mahaffey (10–6) || None || 24,486 || 70–45
|- style="background:#bfb"
| 116 || August 17 || Cubs || 8–1 || Chris Short (12–6) || Ernie Broglio (7–10) || None || 17,355 || 71–45
|- style="background:#fbb"
| 117 || August 18 || Cubs || 3–4  || Freddie Burdette (1–0) || John Boozer (3–3) || Ernie Broglio (1) || 18,401 || 71–46
|- style="background:#bfb"
| 118 || August 19 || Cubs || 9–5 || Jack Baldschun (5–5) || Lindy McDaniel (1–6) || None || 18,140 || 72–46
|- style="background:#bfb"
| 119 || August 20  || Pirates || 2–0 || Art Mahaffey (11–6) || Bob Friend (10–13) || None ||  || 73–46
|- style="background:#bfb"
| 120 || August 20  || Pirates || 3–2 || Rick Wise (5–1) || Don Schwall (4–3) || Ed Roebuck (12) || 35,814 || 74–46
|- style="background:#bfb"
| 121 || August 21 || Pirates || 2–0 || Chris Short (13–6) || Bob Veale (13–10) || None || 30,170 || 75–46
|- style="background:#fbb"
| 122 || August 22 || Pirates || 4–9 || Frank Bork (2–0) || Dennis Bennett (9–10) || Al McBean (17) || 14,955 || 75–47
|- style="background:#bfb"
| 123 || August 23 || Pirates || 9–3 || Jim Bunning (14–4) || Joe Gibbon (9–6) || John Boozer (2) || 19,213 || 76–47
|- style="background:#fbb"
| 124 || August 24 || @ Braves || 9–12 || Bob Sadowski (8–8) || Dennis Bennett (9–11) || None || 11,726 || 76–48
|- style="background:#fbb"
| 125 || August 25 || @ Braves || 5–7 || Tony Cloninger (13–12) || Rick Wise (5–2) || Billy Hoeft (4) || 16,248 || 76–49
|- style="background:#bfb"
| 126 || August 26 || @ Braves || 6–1 || Chris Short (14–6) || Denny Lemaster (13–9) || None || 12,158 || 77–49
|- style="background:#fbb"
| 127 || August 28 || @ Pirates || 2–4 || Roy Face (3–3) || Ed Roebuck (4–3) || None || 20,374 || 77–50
|- style="background:#bfb"
| 128 || August 29 || @ Pirates || 10–8 || Art Mahaffey (12–6) || Bob Friend (10–15) || Jack Baldschun (18) || 12,186 || 78–50
|- style="background:#fbb"
| 129 || August 30 || @ Pirates || 2–10 || Bob Veale (14–10) || Chris Short (14–7) || None || 14,080 || 78–51

|- style="background:#bfb"
| 130 || September 1 || Colt .45s || 4–3 || Jim Bunning (15–4) || Hal Brown (2–14) || None || 13,306 || 79–51
|- style="background:#bfb"
| 131 || September 2 || Colt .45s || 2–1 || Chris Short (15–7) || Don Nottebart (6–9) || None || 12,616 || 80–51
|- style="background:#fbb"
| 132 || September 3 || Colt .45s || 0–6 || Don Larsen (3–6) || Dennis Bennett (9–12) || None || 12,908 || 80–52
|- style="background:#bfb"
| 133 || September 4 || Giants || 5–3 || Jack Baldschun (6–5) || Billy O'Dell (8–7) || None || 28,149 || 81–52
|- style="background:#bfb"
| 134 || September 5 || Giants || 9–3 || Jim Bunning (16–4) || Bobby Bolin (5–7) || None || 31,482 || 82–52
|- style="background:#fbb"
| 135 || September 6 || Giants || 3–4 || Juan Marichal (17–6) || Jack Baldschun (6–6) || None || 21,548 || 82–53
|- style="background:#bfb"
| 136 || September 7  || Dodgers || 5–1 || Dennis Bennett (10–12) || Larry Miller (3–7) || None ||  || 83–53
|- style="background:#fbb"
| 137 || September 7  || Dodgers || 1–3 || Pete Richert (1–1) || Rick Wise (5–3) || Ron Perranoski (11) || 26,390 || 83–54
|- style="background:#fbb"
| 138 || September 8 || Dodgers || 2–3 || Jim Brewer (2–2) || Art Mahaffey (12–7) || Ron Perranoski (12) || 14,594 || 83–55
|- style="background:#fbb"
| 139 || September 9 || Cardinals || 5–10  || Bob Humphreys (2–0) || Jack Baldschun (6–7) || None || 25,339 || 83–56
|- style="background:#bfb"
| 140 || September 10 || Cardinals || 5–1 || Chris Short (16–7) || Ray Sadecki (16–10) || None || 14,552 || 84–56
|- style="background:#bfb"
| 141 || September 11 || @ Giants || 1–0 || Dennis Bennett (11–12) || Juan Marichal (17–7) || None || 27,524 || 85–56
|- style="background:#fbb"
| 142 || September 12 || @ Giants || 1–9 || Gaylord Perry (11–9) || Art Mahaffey (12–8) || None || 29,463 || 85–57
|- style="background:#bfb"
| 143 || September 13 || @ Giants || 4–1  || Jim Bunning (17–4) || Dick Estelle (0–1) || None || 35,205 || 86–57
|- style="background:#bfb"
| 144 || September 14 || @ Colt .45s || 4–1 || Chris Short (17–7) || Bob Bruce (13–9) || None || 4,909 || 87–57
|- style="background:#bfb"
| 145 || September 15 || @ Colt .45s || 1–0 || Dennis Bennett (12–12) || Ken Johnson (10–16) || Jack Baldschun (19) || 4,161 || 88–57
|- style="background:#fbb"
| 146 || September 16 || @ Colt .45s || 5–6 || Hal Brown (3–15) || Jim Bunning (17–5) || Hal Woodeshick (23) || 2,289 || 88–58
|- style="background:#bfb"
| 147 || September 17 || @ Dodgers || 4–3 || Bobby Shantz (2–4) || Don Drysdale (18–14) || Jack Baldschun (20) || 21,175 || 89–58
|- style="background:#fbb"
| 148 || September 18 || @ Dodgers || 3–4 || Bob Miller (7–6) || Jack Baldschun (6–8) || None || 26,341 || 89–59
|- style="background:#fbb"
| 149 || September 19 || @ Dodgers || 3–4  || Phil Ortega (7–9) || Jack Baldschun (6–9) || None || 27,146 || 89–60
|- style="background:#bfb"
| 150 || September 20 || @ Dodgers || 3–2 || Jim Bunning (18–5) || Jim Brewer (2–3) || None || 25,867 || 90–60
|- style="background:#fbb"
| 151 || September 21 || Reds || 0–1 || John Tsitouris (8–11) || Art Mahaffey (12–9) || None || 20,067 || 90–61
|- style="background:#fbb"
| 152 || September 22 || Reds || 2–9 || Jim O'Toole (16–7) || Chris Short (17–8) || None || 21,232 || 90–62
|- style="background:#fbb"
| 153 || September 23 || Reds || 4–6 || Billy McCool (6–3) || Dennis Bennett (12–13) || Sammy Ellis (11) || 23,247 || 90–63
|- style="background:#fbb"
| 154 || September 24 || Braves || 3–5 || Wade Blasingame (7–5) || Jim Bunning (18–6) || Chi-Chi Olivo (4) || 17,342 || 90–64
|- style="background:#fbb"
| 155 || September 25 || Braves || 5–7  || Clay Carroll (1–0) || John Boozer (3–4) || Tony Cloninger (2) || 30,447 || 90–65
|- style="background:#fbb"
| 156 || September 26 || Braves || 4–6 || Wade Blasingame (8–5) || Bobby Shantz (2–5) || Warren Spahn (2) || 14,330 || 90–66
|- style="background:#fbb"
| 157 || September 27 || Braves || 8–14 || Tony Cloninger (18–14) || Jim Bunning (18–7) || Chi-Chi Olivo (5) || 20,569 || 89–67
|- style="background:#fbb"
| 158 || September 28 || @ Cardinals || 1–5 || Bob Gibson (18–11) || Chris Short (17–9) || Barney Schultz (12) || 24,146 || 90–68
|- style="background:#fbb"
| 159 || September 29 || @ Cardinals || 2–4 || Ray Sadecki (20–10) || Dennis Bennett (12–14) || Barney Schultz (13) || 27,433 || 90–69
|- style="background:#fbb"
| 160 || September 30 || @ Cardinals || 5–8 || Curt Simmons (18–9) || Jim Bunning (18–8) || Gordie Richardson (1) || 29,920 || 90–70

|- style="background:#bfb"
| 161 || October 2 || @ Reds || 4–3 || Ed Roebuck (5–3) || Billy McCool (6–5) || Jack Baldschun (21) || 25,221 || 91–70
|- style="background:#bfb"
| 162 || October 4 || @ Reds || 10–0 || Jim Bunning (19–8) || John Tsitouris (9–13) || None || 28,535 || 92–70

|-
|  Source:

Roster

Player stats

Batting

Starters by position 
Note: Pos = Position; G = Games played; AB = At bats; R = Runs; H = Hits; Avg. = Batting average; HR = Home runs; RBI = Runs batted In; SB = Stolen bases

Other batters 
Note: G = Games played; AB = At bats; R = Runs; H = Hits; Avg. = Batting average; HR = Home runs; RBI = Runs batted In; SB = Stolen bases

Pitching

Starting pitchers 
Note: G = Games pitched; IP = Innings pitched; W = Wins; L = Losses; ERA = Earned run average; SO = Strikeouts

Other pitchers 
Note: G = Games pitched; IP = Innings pitched; W = Wins; L = Losses; ERA = Earned run average; SO = Strikeouts

Relief pitchers 
Note: G = Games pitched; W = Wins; L = Losses; SV = Saves; ERA = Earned run average; SO = Strikeouts

Farm system

See also
 2018 Philadelphia Phillies season

Notes

References 
 1964 Philadelphia Phillies at Baseball Reference
 1964 Philadelphia Phillies at Baseball Almanac

External links 

Philadelphia Phillies seasons
Philadelphia Phillies season
Philadelph